Centaur may refer to one of the following ships:

 , an Australian hospital ship sunk in 1943
 , eight ships of the British Royal Navy
 SB Centaur, Thames sailing barge

Fictional ships
 USS Centaur, a fictional starship in the Star Trek universe; appeared primarily in the Star Trek: Deep Space Nine episode "A Time to Stand"

Ship names